Johann Michael Siegfried Löwe (June 24, 1756 – May 10, 1831), born Moses Samuel Löwe, was a German painter and engraver.

Biography
Löwe was born into a Jewish family in Königsberg, Prussia, in 1756. From 1770 to 1774 he studied at the Berliner Akademie under Blaise Nicholas Le Sueur, Daniel Chodowiecki, and Johann Christoph Frisch. He was later a student of Giovanni Battista Casanova and Anton Graff in Dresden.

Aided by the friendship and influence of the Friedländer family, he had achieved such a reputation by 1780 that the empress Catherine II of Russia commissioned him to paint her portrait. His pictures were among the most popular in the German exhibitions, and he was one of the foremost miniaturists and pastel-painters of his time.

In 1806–7 Löwe published the series Bildnisse jetzt lebender Berliner Gelehrten mit ihren Selbstbiographien, which included portraits of Christoph Wilhelm Hufeland, Johann Elert Bode, and Lazarus Bendavid, among others. It was praised by Goethe.

He was also a chess master and a Freemason.

References
 

1756 births
1831 deaths
18th-century engravers
18th-century German Jews
18th-century German painters
18th-century German male artists
19th-century engravers
19th-century German Jews
19th-century German painters
Artists from Königsberg
German engravers
German etchers
German Freemasons
German portrait painters
Jewish engravers
Jewish painters
Portrait miniaturists
Prussian Academy of Arts alumni
Academic staff of the Prussian Academy of Arts